Net 2 Television is a private, free-to-air television broadcaster in Accra, Ghana.

External links 
 UTV
 http://www.mframa.com/stations/television/

Television stations in Ghana
Mass media in Accra